Yeniyurt can refer to:

 Yeniyurt Castle, castle ruin in Mersin Province, Turkey
 Yeniyurt, Erdemli, a village in Erdemli district of Mersin Province, Turkey
 Yeniyurt, Kaynaşlı, a village in the Kaynaşlı District of Düzce Province in Turkey
 Yeniyurt, Refahiye